WOPX-TV (channel 56) is a television station licensed to Melbourne, Florida, United States, broadcasting the Ion Television network to the Orlando area. Owned and operated by the Ion Media subsidiary of the E.W. Scripps Company, the station maintains offices on Grand National Drive in Orlando, and its transmitter is located on Nova Road east of St. Cloud.

History

WAYK
WAYK signed on December 30, 1985, as an independent station. In 1988, Beach TV Partners signed on WAYQ at channel 26 as a simulcast of WAYK, giving them a signal in Daytona Beach. In early August 1990, owner Beach Television Partners based in Vero Beach filed for Chapter 11 reorganization over an inability to renegotiate a loan payment schedule. At the time, the station was only carried part-time on CableVision of Central Florida, Orlando's major cable system. WAYK was affiliated with the Beach TV investor, Harry Handley, who founded the Star Television Network.

WIRB
In 1992, the stations were both sold to Robert Rich, who added more paid programming to the channels. WAYK became WIRB, and WAYQ became WNTO. WIRB continued as a low budget independent station but also aired some NBC programs that were not cleared by WESH most notably Leeza (before it went into syndication) and California Dreams. WIRB would broadcast Florida Marlins baseball, Florida Panthers hockey, and Tampa Bay Lightning hockey to Central Florida from around 1993 to 1996. In 1996, Christian Television Network would buy WIRB (Paxson Communications, the predecessor to Ion Media, took a LMA on the station at the same time) while Florida Media Broadcasters would buy WNTO (which would be later sold to Entravision and became Univision affiliate WVEN). WIRB then ran religious shows in the morning, infomercials in the afternoon and evening, and Christian praise and worship music on overnights in addition to the NBC programs not cleared by WESH.

WOPX
In January 1998, Paxson bought the station from CTN and renamed it WOPX (the -TV callsign would be added in 2012) and continued with the same format until August 31, 1998. At that point, WOPX took the Pax TV affiliation along with other stations owned by Paxson. Pax TV introduced family entertainment like dramas, movies, reality shows aimed at the family, game shows and other programming.
 
Originally, Pax TV ran from noon to midnight, but has since reduced its schedule several times. At one point, it ran from 6 p.m. to 11 p.m., and there are no original programs on the network, which has been renamed Ion. WOPX still fills the rest of its schedule with infomercials and religious shows. WOPX of recent has also carried Tampa Bay Rays baseball and Tampa Bay Lightning hockey from Ion's Tampa affiliate and produced by Fox Sports.

On September 4, 2004, WOPX aired the NASCAR Xfinity Series (then Busch) race from California Speedway due to local NBC (who at that time broadcast NBS races) affiliate WESH's coverage of Hurricane Francis.

Until the summer of 2005, WOPX had a JSA with WESH, which, during that time, WOPX aired a rebroadcast of WESH's 6 p.m. newscast at 7 p.m.. In July 2005, Paxson dissolved all relationships with other stations, mostly NBC stations—at that time, WESH's news repeats on WOPX ended.

On December 15, 2014, Ion reached a deal to donate WOPX-TV's low-power repeater in Daytona Beach, WPXB-LD (channel 50), to Word of God Fellowship, parent company of the Daystar network.

Technical information

Subchannels 
The station's digital signal is multiplexed:

Analog-to-digital conversion
WOPX-TV shut down its analog signal, over UHF channel 56, on June 12, 2009, the official date in which full-power television stations in the United States transitioned from analog to digital broadcasts under federal mandate. The station's digital signal continued to broadcast on its pre-transition UHF channel 48. Through the use of PSIP, digital television receivers display the station's virtual channel as its former UHF analog channel 56, which was among the high band UHF channels (52-69) that were removed from broadcasting use as a result of the transition.

References

External links

Ion Television affiliates
Bounce TV affiliates
Grit (TV network) affiliates
Defy TV affiliates
TrueReal affiliates
Scripps News affiliates
E. W. Scripps Company television stations
Television channels and stations established in 1985
OPX-TV
National Hockey League over-the-air television broadcasters
1985 establishments in Florida
Melbourne, Florida